John Hubert Plunkett  (June 1802 – 9 May 1869) was Attorney-General of New South Wales, an appointed member of the Legislative Council 1836–41, 1843–56, 1857–58 and 1861–69. He was also elected as a member of the Legislative Assembly 1856–60. He is best known for the prosecution of the colonists who brutally murdered 28 Aboriginals in the Myall Creek Massacre of 1838, seven of whom were convicted and hanged.

Early life
John Hubert Plunkett was born at Mount Plunkett, County Roscommon, Ireland, younger of twins and son of George Plunkett, and his wife Eileen, née O'Kelly. Plunkett entered Trinity College Dublin, in November 1819 (graduating B.A. in 1824) and was called to the Irish bar in 1826 and later to the English bar. He practised as a barrister on the Connaught circuit in 1826–32 with distinction, fought for Catholic Emancipation, and was given credit by Daniel O'Connell for the success of the Whig candidates in Connaught at the general election in 1830.

Legal career in Australia
In 1831 Plunkett was appointed Solicitor-General of New South Wales on a salary of £800. Plunkett, his wife, sister and four female servants arrived in Sydney on the Southworth in June 1832. The attorney-general at the time, John Kinchela, was deaf and Plunkett had to undertake most of his duties. In February 1836 Kinchela retired from his position, Plunkett took his place. Later in 1836 Plunkett was associated with Governor Richard Bourke in bringing about a new church and schools act. He was determined to establish equality before the law, first by extending jury rights to emancipists and he then extended legal protections to convicts and assigned servants. Finally Plunkett attempted to legally protect aboriginals, and twice charged the perpetrators of the Myall Creek massacre with murder. The first trial resulted in acquittal on a technical point; however the second resulted in a conviction. Plunkett's Church Building Act 1836, disestablished the Church of England and established legal equality between Anglicans, Catholics, Presbyterians and later Methodists.

Plunkett obtained leave of absence to attend to family matters in Ireland from late 1841, and did not return to Sydney until August 1843. Roger Therry was appointed acting attorney-general in May 1841, to serve during Plunkett's absence.  Following the death of Chief Justice Sir James Dowling in September 1844, Plunkett asserted that he should be offered the vacant position as a right of his position as Attorney-General. The Executive Council rejected his claimed right to the position, and Supreme Court judge Alfred Stephen was appointed. Plunkett was offered appointment as a judge, filling the position vacated by Stephen but declined it. He was made a member of the Executive Council in March 1847, and in 1848, when the national school system was founded, was appointed chairman of the Board of Education. He retired as Attorney-General in 1856, receiving a pension of £1,200 a year. He was appointed a Queen's Counsel on 6 June 1856, the first NSW Barrister to be so appointed.

Parliamentary career
In the same year he was elected as the member for both Bathurst (County) and Argyle in the Legislative Assembly at the first election under the new constitution. Plunkett was sworn in as member for Argyle and Bathurst on 22 May 1856, before submitting his resignation from Bathurst on 29 May, stating that the rules of the House would not allow him to send in his resignation earlier. Plunkett resigned from the Assembly in January 1857, was nominated to the Legislative Council, and elected its President. In February 1858, on account of the Board of Education having issued regulations which Charles Cowper, then Premier, disapproved of, Plunkett was dismissed from his position as chairman and he thereupon resigned from the council. There was much public sympathy with Plunkett, and the government offered to reinstate him if he would withdraw statements he had made in letters which were considered offensive. Plunkett declined to do so. Plunkett was again a member of the Legislative Assembly for Cumberland (North Riding) from September 1858 to April 1859 and for West Sydney from June 1859 to November 1860. In June 1861 he was nominated to the council, and from October 1863 to February 1865 was vice-president of the Executive Council in the first James Martin ministry. Plunkett was then reconciled with Cowper, and from August 1865 to January 1866 was Attorney-General in the fourth Cowper ministry.

Plunkett was also vice-chancellor of the University of Sydney in 1865–67. For the last two years of his life he lived much at Melbourne on account of his wife's health, and he made his last public appearance there in 1869 as secretary to the provincial council of the Roman Catholic Church. He died on 9 May 1869 at East Melbourne leaving a widow but no children. Plunkett's remains were taken to Sydney and buried in the old Devonshire Street Cemetery, beside those of Archpriest John Joseph Therry and Archdeacon McEncroe.
Plunkett was the author of The Australian Magistrate; a Guide to the Duties of a Justice of the Peace, first published in 1835 and reissued in at least three subsequent editions; The Magistrate's Pocket Book (1859), and On the Evidence of Accomplices (1863).

Plunkett was dignified and somewhat austere in manner, though he could relax on occasions such as the annual St Patrick's Day dinner which he chaired. Plunkett had much ability and exercised great influence in the early days of education in New South Wales and in the anti-transportation movement. John Fairfax said he was "the greatest friend of civil and religious liberty in the colony", and he was in advance of his time in his attitude to the land question, and in his advocacy of manhood suffrage.

Family
John Plunkett's niece, Georgina Isabella O'Sullivan née Keon (Daughter of Ferdinand Keon 1794-1876 and John's sister Margaret Plunkett) published 'Twofold Bay Waltzes in 1864 dedicated to her uncle, John Plunkett. The Cover artwork shows a view from the Eden residence of her brother George Plunkett Keon JP, a police magistrate who was buried in 1899 with his brother Hubert Keon.

References

 

1802 births
1869 deaths
Politicians from County Roscommon
19th-century Irish people
Members of the New South Wales Legislative Council
Members of the New South Wales Legislative Assembly
Presidents of the New South Wales Legislative Council
Attorneys General of the Colony of New South Wales
Solicitors General for New South Wales
Australian King's Counsel
Irish emigrants to Australia
Australian Roman Catholics
19th-century Australian politicians
Vice-Chancellors of the University of Sydney